Joe Carroll (born 21 June 1991) is an Australian cricketer. He made his Twenty20 debut for Leinster Lightning in the 2018 Inter-Provincial Trophy on 18 May 2018.

References

External links
 

1991 births
Living people
Australian cricketers
Leinster Lightning cricketers
Place of birth missing (living people)